The Computer Law & Security Review is a journal accessible to a wide range of professional legal and IT practitioners, businesses, academics, researchers, libraries and organisations in both the public and private sectors, the Computer Law and Security Review regularly covers:

CLSR Briefing with special emphasis on UK/US developments
European Union update
National news from 10 European jurisdictions
Pacific rim news column
Refereed practitioner and academic papers on topics such as Web 2.0, IT security, Identity management, ID cards, RFID, interference with privacy, Internet law, telecoms regulation, online broadcasting, intellectual property, software law, e-commerce, outsourcing, data protection and freedom of information and many other topics.

The Journal's Correspondent Panel includes more than 40 specialists in IT law and security.

Each issue contains articles, case law analysis and current news on information and communications technology.

Special Features
High quality peer reviewed papers from internationally renowned practitioner and academic experts
Latest developments reported in situ by more than 20 leading law firms from around the world
Highly experienced and respected editor and correspondents panel
Online access to all 23 volumes of CLSR with embedded web links to primary sources
Contact details of all authors
A pool of expertise that can collectively identify the key topics that need to be examined.

External links
 Elsevier.com - Computer Law & Security Review
 Computer Law & Security Review

British law journals
Computer science journals
Works about computer law
Computer security
Elsevier academic journals